Mount Stonehouse is a peak, 2,900 m, standing 3.5 nautical miles (6 km) southwest of Mount Falla in Queen Alexandra Range. Named by the New Zealand Geological Survey Antarctic Expedition (NZGSAE) (1961–62) for Bernard Stonehouse who has made studies of Antarctic penguins and seals.

Mountains of the Ross Dependency
Shackleton Coast